Magsanoc is a surname. Notable people with the surname include:

 Kara Magsanoc-Alikpala, Filipino journalist
 Letty Jimenez Magsanoc (1941–2015), Filipino journalist
 Ronnie Magsanoc (born 1966), Filipino basketball player and coach

Pangasinan-language surnames